Chasmopodium afzelii is a species of swamp grass native to Sierra Leone and Togo.

References

Andropogoneae
Flora of West Tropical Africa
Taxa named by Eduard Hackel